Charminus is a genus of nursery web spiders that was first described by Tamerlan Thorell in 1899.

Species
 it contains nine species and one subspecies, found only in Africa:
Charminus aethiopicus (Caporiacco, 1939) – Ethiopia, Kenya
Charminus ambiguus (Lessert, 1925) – East, Southern Africa
Charminus a. concolor (Caporiacco, 1947) – East Africa
Charminus atomarius (Lawrence, 1942) – Central, East, Southern Africa
Charminus bifidus Blandin, 1978 – Rwanda
Charminus camerunensis Thorell, 1899 (type) – West, Central Africa
Charminus marfieldi (Roewer, 1955) – West, Central Africa
Charminus minor (Lessert, 1928) – Ivory Coast, Congo
Charminus natalensis (Lawrence, 1947) – South Africa
Charminus rotundus Blandin, 1978 – Congo

See also
 List of Pisauridae species

References

Araneomorphae genera
Pisauridae
Spiders of Africa
Taxa named by Tamerlan Thorell